Emily Keiko Kuroda (born October 30, 1952) is an American actress. She is best known for her role as Mrs. Kim on TV's Gilmore Girls, but she has had a long career on stage and screen and is a veteran of East West Players, Los Angeles's premier Asian American theater group.

Early life and education
Kuroda, a Japanese American, was born in Fresno, California, the daughter of Kay and William Kuroda. She began acting and directing in high school and majored in drama at California State University, Fresno before launching her career on stage and screen.

Career
Kuroda has performed in numerous plays including Luis Alfaro's Straight as a Line at Playwrights' Arena, directed by Jon Lawrence Rivera, Chay Yew's Red at East West Players, Winter People at the Boston Court, and Ken Narasaki's Innocent When You Dream at the Electric Lodge, which was directed by her husband, Alberto Isaac. She appeared in Narasaki's No-No Boy at the Miles Memorial Playhouse in Santa Monica CA, also directed by Isaac, alongside her Gilmore Girls daughter, Keiko Agena.  Other theatres include New York's Public Theater, La Jolla Playhouse, Seattle Rep, Singapore Repertory Theatre, Berkeley Repertory Theatre, LA Women's Shakespeare Company, Los Angeles Shakespeare Festival, and Lodestone Theatre Ensemble.

Kuroda completed seven years as Mrs. Kim in Warner Brothers’ Gilmore Girls as well as the Netflix revisit in 2016.  She also played opposite Flavor Flav in 13 episodes of Under One Roof.  Recent television credits include a recurring role on  Drop Dead Diva as (Margaret Cho's mother), Medium, Grey's Anatomy, In Case of Emergency, Six Feet Under, The King of Queens, Curb Your Enthusiasm, The Practice, General Hospital, Port Charles, L.A. Law, ER, The Young and the Restless, The Bold and the Beautiful, The Division, The Agency, Presidio Med, Arliss, and the television special About Love (Emmy nominated). Feature films include RED, PEEP WORLD, Minority Report, Stranger Inside, 2 Days in the Valley, Dad, Broken Words, Worth Winning and Shopgirl.  She has also appeared in independent Asian American films, including The Sensei, Yellow and Stand Up for Justice.

She is a member of the Screen Actors Guild, American Federation of Television and Radio Artists, and the Actors' Equity Association.

Personal life
Kuroda is married to actor/director Alberto Isaac. She has two brothers.

Filmography

Film

Television

Theatre

Awards and other recognitions

References

External links
 
 
 Interview with UCLA International Institute

1952 births
20th-century American actresses
21st-century American actresses
American actresses of Japanese descent
American film actors of Asian descent
American film actresses
American stage actresses
American television actresses
American theatre directors of Japanese descent
California State University, Fresno alumni
Actresses from Fresno, California
Living people